Ivan Litera (Serbian Cyrillic: Иван Литера; born 13 February 1976) is a Serbian former professional footballer who played as a midfielder.

Honours
Obilić
 First League of FR Yugoslavia: 1997–98

External links
 
 

Association football midfielders
First Professional Football League (Bulgaria) players
C.F. Estrela da Amadora players
Expatriate footballers in Bulgaria
Expatriate footballers in Portugal
First League of Serbia and Montenegro players
FK Obilić players
FK Zemun players
PFC CSKA Sofia players
PFC Velbazhd Kyustendil players
Portimonense S.C. players
Primeira Liga players
S.C. Salgueiros players
Liga Portugal 2 players
Serbia and Montenegro expatriate footballers
Serbia and Montenegro expatriate sportspeople in Bulgaria
Serbia and Montenegro under-21 international footballers
Serbian footballers
Serbian SuperLiga players
Footballers from Belgrade
1976 births
Living people
Serbian expatriate sportspeople in Portugal